Delta School District or Delta School Board may refer to:

 School District 37 Delta, in British Columbia, Canada
 Delta/Greely School District, in Delta Junction, Alaska, USA
 KIPP: Delta Public Schools, a school district in Helena–West Helena, Arkansas, USA
 River Delta Unified School District, Sacramento County, California, USA
 South Delta School District, Tsawwassen, British Columbia, Canada
 Delta View Joint Union School District, Kings County, California, USA
 Pike-Delta-York Local School District, Fulton County, Ohio, USA
 Delta Special School District, Desha County, Arkansas, USA

See also
 Delta (disambiguation)